Richard L. Peterson is an American behavioral economist and psychiatrist.
He has developed behavioral finance-based quantitative models, imaged the brains of test subjects while play-trading, and is a writer and consultant in the psychology of financial decisions and the mining of sentiment in social media.
Peterson developed text mining software to identify and quantify economically predictive sentiments, and speaks widely in the area of behavioral finance and social media analytics.

Life
Peterson graduated from the University of Texas, with a BS cum laude in Electrical Engineering, a BA, and Doctor of Medicine degrees (M.D.).  He performed postdoctoral neuroeconomics research at Stanford University, is Board-certified in Psychiatry, and is a visiting scholar at Claremont Graduate University.

He is an investment advisor and managing director of the sentiment analysis firm MarketPsych Data and the psychology-based quantitative asset management firm MarketPsy Capital. In the educational field he developed financial personality tests, published in academic journals and textbooks, and is an associate editor of the Journal of Behavioral Finance.  In 2007, Peterson wrote Inside the Investor's Brain (Wiley), which translated behavioral finance concepts from academia to a lay audience.  In 2016 he published Trading on Sentiment (Wiley), which explained sentiment-based patterns in financial market prices.

Peterson has appeared in CBS Evening News, CNBC, NPR, BBC, Wall Street Journal, Financial Times, and Harvard Business Review.

He lives in California with his family.

Academic journal articles
 Peterson R. (2007). "Affect and Financial Decision Making: How neuroscience can inform market participants." Journal of Behavioral Finance, v8, n2. 
 Peterson R. (2005). "Investing Lessons from Neuroscience: fMRI of the reward system." Brain Research Bulletin. v67, n5, 391-397.
 Knutson B, Taylor J, Kaufman M, Peterson R, Glover G. (2005). "Distributed Neural Representation of Expected Value." Journal of Neuroscience, 25, 4806-4812.
 Knutson B & Peterson, R. (2005). "Neurally reconstructing expected utility." Games and Economic Behavior. 52, 305-315.
 Peterson, R. (2002). "'Buy on the Rumor:' Anticipatory affect and investor behavior."  Journal of Psychology and Financial Markets, v3, n4.

Textbook chapters
 Peterson R. (2014). "Neurofinance." Chapter 23 of Behavioral Finance. Eds. Baker and Ricciardi. John Wiley & Sons: New York.
 Peterson R. (2010). "Neuroeconomics and Neurofinance." Chapter 5 of Behavioral Finance: Investors, Corporations, and Markets. Eds. Baker and Nofsinger. John Wiley & Sons: New York.
 Peterson R. (2005). "Buy on the Rumor and Sell on the News." Chapter 30 of the textbook Risk Management, Elsevier Publishing.

Books
Inside the Investor's Brain: The Power of Mind over Money, Wiley, John & Sons, July 2007, 
MarketPsych:  How to Manage Fear and Build Your Investor Identity, Wiley, John & Sons, September 2010, 
Trading on Sentiment:  The Power of Minds over Markets. Wiley, John & Sons: New York, March 2016,

References

External links
"Thomson Reuters MarketPsych Indices", "Thomson Reuters"
"5 Questions for Richard L. Peterson", On Wall Street
"Pro stock traders looking to Twitter, Facebook for tips", "Los Angeles Times"

1972 births
Living people
Cockrell School of Engineering alumni
Stanford University people
American psychiatrists
Behavioral finance
Behavioral economists